Ethane is an organic chemical compound with chemical formula . At standard temperature and pressure, ethane is a colorless, odorless gas. Like many hydrocarbons, ethane is isolated on an industrial scale from natural gas and as a petrochemical by-product of petroleum refining. Its chief use is as feedstock for ethylene production.

Related compounds may be formed by replacing a hydrogen atom with another functional group; the ethane moiety is called an ethyl group. For example, an ethyl group linked to a hydroxyl group yields ethanol, the alcohol in beverages.

History 
Ethane was first synthesised in 1834 by Michael Faraday, applying electrolysis of a potassium acetate solution. He mistook the hydrocarbon product of this reaction for methane and did not investigate it further.

During the period 1847–1849, in an effort to vindicate the radical theory of organic chemistry, Hermann Kolbe and Edward Frankland produced ethane by the reductions of propionitrile (ethyl cyanide) and ethyl iodide with potassium metal, and, as did Faraday, by the electrolysis of aqueous acetates. They mistook the product of these reactions for the methyl radical, of which ethane is a dimer.

This error was corrected in 1864 by Carl Schorlemmer, who showed that the product of all these reactions was in fact ethane. Ethane was discovered dissolved in Pennsylvanian light crude oil by Edmund Ronalds in 1864.

Properties
At standard temperature and pressure, ethane is a colorless, odorless gas. Solid ethane exists in several modifications. On cooling under normal pressure, the first modification to appear is a plastic crystal, crystallizing in the cubic system. In this form, the positions of the hydrogen atoms are not fixed; the molecules may rotate freely around the long axis. Cooling this ethane below ca.  changes it to monoclinic metastable ethane II (space group P 21/n). Ethane is only very sparingly soluble in water.

The bond parameters of ethane have been measured to high precision by microwave spectroscopy and electron diffraction: rC−C = 1.528(3) Å, rC−H = 1.088(5) Å, and ∠CCH = 111.6(5)°  by microwave and rC−C = 1.524(3) Å, rC−H = 1.089(5) Å, and ∠CCH = 111.9(5)° by electron diffraction (the numbers in parentheses represents the uncertainties in the final digits).

Atmospheric and extraterrestrial

Ethane occurs as a trace gas in the Earth's atmosphere, currently having a concentration at sea level of 0.5 ppb, though its preindustrial concentration is likely to have been only around 0.25 part per billion since a significant proportion of the ethane in today's atmosphere may have originated as fossil fuels. Global ethane quantities have varied over time, likely due to flaring at natural gas fields. Global ethane emission rates declined from 1984 to 2010, though increased shale gas production at the Bakken Formation in the U.S. has arrested the decline by half.

Although ethane is a greenhouse gas, it is much less abundant than methane, has a lifetime of only a few months compared to over a decade, and is also less efficient at absorbing radiation relative to mass. In fact, ethane's global warming potential largely results from its conversion in the atmosphere to methane. It has been detected as a trace component in the atmospheres of all four giant planets, and in the atmosphere of Saturn's moon Titan.

Atmospheric ethane results from the Sun's photochemical action on methane gas, also present in these atmospheres: ultraviolet photons of shorter wavelengths than 160 nm can photo-dissociate the methane molecule into a methyl radical and a hydrogen atom. When two methyl radicals recombine, the result is ethane:

 CH4 → CH3• + •H
 CH3• + •CH3 → C2H6

In Earth's atmosphere, hydroxyl radicals convert ethane to methanol vapor with a half-life of around three months.

It is suspected that ethane produced in this fashion on Titan rains back onto the moon's surface, and over time has accumulated into hydrocarbon seas covering much of the moon's polar regions. In December 2007 the Cassini probe found at least one lake at Titan's south pole, now called Ontario Lacus because of the lake's similar area to Lake Ontario on Earth (approximately 20,000 km2). Further analysis of infrared spectroscopic data presented in July 2008 provided additional evidence for the presence of liquid ethane in Ontario Lacus. Several significantly larger hydrocarbon lakes, Ligeia Mare and Kraken Mare being the two largest, were discovered near Titan's north pole using radar data gathered by Cassini. These lakes are believed to be filled primarily by a mixture of liquid ethane and methane.

In 1996, ethane was detected in Comet Hyakutake, and it has since been detected in some other comets. The existence of ethane in these distant solar system bodies may implicate ethane as a primordial component of the solar nebula from which the sun and planets are believed to have formed.

In 2006, Dale Cruikshank of NASA/Ames Research Center (a New Horizons co-investigator) and his colleagues announced the spectroscopic discovery of ethane on Pluto's surface.

Chemistry

Ethane can be viewed as two methyl groups joined, that is, a dimer of methyl groups. In the laboratory, ethane may be conveniently synthesised by Kolbe electrolysis. In this technique, an aqueous solution of an acetate salt is electrolysed. At the anode, acetate is oxidized to produce carbon dioxide and methyl radicals, and the highly reactive methyl radicals combine to produce ethane:
 CH3COO− → CH3• + CO2 + e−
 CH3• + •CH3 → C2H6

Synthesis by oxidation of acetic anhydride by peroxides, is conceptually similar.

The chemistry of ethane involves chiefly free radical reactions. Ethane can react with the halogens, especially chlorine and bromine, by free-radical halogenation. This reaction proceeds through the propagation of the ethyl radical:

 C2H5• + Cl2 → C2H5Cl + Cl•
 Cl• + C2H6 → C2H5• + HCl

Because halogenated ethanes can undergo further free radical halogenation, this process results in a mixture of several halogenated products. In the chemical industry, more selective chemical reactions are used for the production of any particular two-carbon haloalkane.

Combustion
The complete combustion of ethane releases 1559.7 kJ/mol, or 51.9 kJ/g, of heat, and produces carbon dioxide and water according to the chemical equation:

 2 C2H6 + 7 O2 → 4 CO2 + 6 H2O + 3120 kJ

Combustion may also occur without an excess of oxygen, forming a mix of amorphous carbon and carbon monoxide.

 2 C2H6 + 3 O2 → 4 C + 6 H2O + energy 
 2 C2H6 + 5 O2 → 4 CO + 6 H2O + energy 
 2 C2H6 + 4 O2 → 2 C + 2 CO + 6 H2O + energy etc.

Combustion occurs by a complex series of free-radical reactions. Computer simulations of the chemical kinetics of ethane combustion have included hundreds of reactions. An important series of reaction in ethane combustion is the combination of an ethyl radical with oxygen, and the subsequent breakup of the resulting peroxide into ethoxy and hydroxyl radicals.

 C2H5• + O2 → C2H5OO•
 C2H5OO• + HR → C2H5OOH + •R
 C2H5OOH → C2H5O• + •OH

The principal carbon-containing products of incomplete ethane combustion are single-carbon compounds such as carbon monoxide and formaldehyde. One important route by which the carbon–carbon bond in ethane is broken, to yield these single-carbon products, is the decomposition of the ethoxy radical into a methyl radical and formaldehyde, which can in turn undergo further oxidation.

 C2H5O• → CH3• + CH2O

Some minor products in the incomplete combustion of ethane include acetaldehyde, methane, methanol, and ethanol. At higher temperatures, especially in the range , ethylene is a significant product. It arises through reactions such as this:

 C2H5• + O2 → C2H4 + •OOH

Similar reactions (with agents other than oxygen as the hydrogen abstractor) are involved in the production of ethylene from ethane in steam cracking.

Barrier

Rotating a molecular substructure about a twistable bond usually requires energy. The minimum energy to produce a 360° bond rotation is called the rotational barrier.

Ethane gives a classic, simple example of such a rotational barrier, sometimes called the "ethane barrier". Among the earliest experimental evidence of this barrier (see diagram at left) was obtained by modelling the entropy of ethane. The three hydrogens at each end are free to pinwheel about the central carbon–carbon bond when provided with sufficient energy to overcome the barrier. The physical origin of the barrier is still not completely settled, although the overlap (exchange) repulsion between the hydrogen atoms on opposing ends of the molecule is perhaps the strongest candidate, with the stabilizing effect of hyperconjugation on the staggered conformation contributing to the phenomenon. Theoretical methods that use an appropriate starting point (orthogonal orbitals) find that hyperconjugation is the most important factor in the origin of the ethane rotation barrier.

As far back as 1890–1891, chemists suggested that ethane molecules preferred the staggered conformation with the two ends of the molecule askew from each other.

Production
After methane, ethane is the second-largest component of natural gas. Natural gas from different gas fields varies in ethane content from less than 1% to more than 6% by volume. Prior to the 1960s, ethane and larger molecules were typically not separated from the methane component of natural gas, but simply burnt along with the methane as a fuel. Today, ethane is an important petrochemical feedstock and is separated from the other components of natural gas in most well-developed gas fields. Ethane can also be separated from petroleum gas, a mixture of gaseous hydrocarbons produced as a byproduct of petroleum refining.

Ethane is most efficiently separated from methane by liquefying it at cryogenic temperatures. Various refrigeration strategies exist: the most economical process presently in wide use employs a turboexpander, and can recover more than 90% of the ethane in natural gas. At this low temperature, gaseous methane can be separated from the liquefied ethane and heavier hydrocarbons by distillation. Further distillation then separates ethane from the propane and heavier hydrocarbons.

Usage
The chief use of ethane is the production of ethylene (ethene) by steam cracking. When diluted with steam and briefly heated to very high temperatures (900 °C or more), heavy hydrocarbons break down into lighter hydrocarbons, and saturated hydrocarbons become unsaturated. Ethane is favored for ethylene production because the steam cracking of ethane is fairly selective for ethylene, while the steam cracking of heavier hydrocarbons yields a product mixture poorer in ethylene and richer in heavier alkenes (olefins), such as propene (propylene) and butadiene, and in aromatic hydrocarbons.

Experimentally, ethane is under investigation as a feedstock for other commodity chemicals. Oxidative chlorination of ethane has long appeared to be a potentially more economical route to vinyl chloride than ethylene chlorination. Many processes for producing this reaction have been patented, but poor selectivity for vinyl chloride and corrosive reaction conditions (specifically, a reaction mixture containing hydrochloric acid at temperatures greater than 500 °C) have discouraged the commercialization of most of them. Presently, INEOS operates a 1000 t/a (tonnes per annum) ethane-to-vinyl chloride pilot plant at Wilhelmshaven in Germany.

Similarly, the Saudi Arabian firm SABIC has announced construction of a 30,000 t/a plant to produce acetic acid by ethane oxidation at Yanbu. The economic viability of this process may rely on the low cost of ethane near Saudi oil fields, and it may not be competitive with methanol carbonylation elsewhere in the world.

Ethane can be used as a refrigerant in cryogenic refrigeration systems. On a much smaller scale, in scientific research, liquid ethane is used to vitrify water-rich samples for cryo-electron microscopy. A thin film of water quickly immersed in liquid ethane at −150 °C or colder freezes too quickly for water to crystallize. Slower freezing methods can generate cubic ice crystals, which can disrupt soft structures by damaging the samples and reduce image quality by scattering the electron beam before it can reach the detector.

Health and safety
At room temperature, ethane is an extremely flammable gas. When mixed with air at 3.0%–12.5% by volume, it forms an explosive mixture.

Some additional precautions are necessary where ethane is stored as a cryogenic liquid. Direct contact with liquid ethane can result in severe frostbite. Until they warm to room temperature, the vapors from liquid ethane are heavier than air and can flow along the floor or ground, gathering in low places; if the vapors encounter an ignition source, the chemical reaction can flash back to the source of ethane from which they evaporated.

Ethane can displace oxygen and become an asphyxiation hazard. Ethane poses no known acute or chronic toxicological risk. It is not a carcinogen.

See also
 Biogas: carbon-neutral alternative to natural gas
 Biorefining
 Biodegradable plastic
 Drop-in bioplastic

References

External links

International Chemical Safety Card 0266
Market-Driven Evolution of Gas Processing Technologies for NGLs
Staggered and eclipsed ethane

 
Alkanes
Industrial gases